Troitsko-Nikolskoye is a rural locality (a selo) in Novoselskoye Rural Settlement, Kovrovsky District, Vladimir Oblast, Russia. The population was 34 as of 2010.

Geography 
Troitsko-Nikolskoye is located 8 km south of Kovrov (the district's administrative centre) by road. Kovrov is the nearest rural locality.

References 

Rural localities in Kovrovsky District